Kalkgurung Airport  is an airport in the Northern Territory of Australia serving Daguragu and Kalkarindji.

See also
 List of airports in the Northern Territory

References

Airports in the Northern Territory